Burgaw Depot is a historic train station located at Burgaw, Pender County, North Carolina. It was built about 1850 by the Wilmington and Weldon Railroad, with a later 1898 "T"-shaped addition of passenger waiting rooms and offices and a 1916-1917 addition of freight and warehouse space.  It is a long one-story rectangular frame building sheathed in a combination of lap and board and batten siding, and resting on cement, brick and wooden foundations.  It is one of only two known surviving antebellum depots in North Carolina; the other is located at Selma, North Carolina.

It was listed on the National Register of Historic Places in 1986.  It is located in the Burgaw Historic District.

References

External links

Railway stations on the National Register of Historic Places in North Carolina
Commercial buildings completed in 1850
Buildings and structures in Pender County, North Carolina
National Register of Historic Places in Pender County, North Carolina
Historic district contributing properties in North Carolina
Former railway stations in North Carolina